Waseem Raza (born 3 January 1993) is an Indian cricketer who plays for Jammu and Kashmir. He was the leading wicket-taker for Jammu & Kashmir in the 2018–19 Vijay Hazare Trophy, with twelve dismissals in eight matches.

References

External links
 

1993 births
Living people
Indian cricketers
Jammu and Kashmir cricketers
People from Srinagar